The Italian National Road Race Championships are a road cycling race held annually, which decides the Italian cycling champion in the road racing discipline, across several categories of rider.

The event was officially first held in 1906 (won by Giovanni Cuniolo), having been held unofficially since 1885. At the beginning there were often back-to-back wins from many riders. Costante Girardengo won the event nine times between 1913 and 1925, either side of World War I, including seven consecutive wins between 1919 and 1925. After his winning streak ended, another Italian cycling legend, Alfredo Binda, won 4 races in a row. Learco Guerra succeeded him with 5 consecutive wins. Since then the event has not been dominated to the same extent, although Fausto Coppi claimed 4 victories. Recent multiple victors have included Vincenzo Nibali, Giovanni Visconti, Paolo Bettini, Salvatore Commesso, Massimo Podenzana and Gianni Bugno. None of the men's road champions have also won the Italian National Time Trial Championships in the same year.

A women's race has been held since 1963, with the first winner being Paola Scotti. The record winner is Maria Canins with six victories.

Multiple winners

Men

Women

Men

Elite

U23

Women

See also
Italian National Time Trial Championships
Maglia tricolore
National road cycling championships

References

 

National road cycling championships
Cycle races in Italy
Recurring sporting events established in 1885
Cycling
1885 establishments in Italy